Emma Elizabeth Mulqueeny  (née Knight; born 12 July 1971) is a British technologist and educator. She is best known for co-founding Rewired State and Young Rewired State, which provided a community and events for technically gifted young people. She has campaigned for programming to be taught from an early age in UK schools to encourage wider uptake and increased diversity in the tech sector.

Early life and education 
Mulqueeny was born as the daughter of Kenneth G Knight and Sara Nicholls (née McArtney).

Career 
Mulqueeny served on the House of Commons' Speaker's Commission on Digital Democracy and was a 2014 Google Personal Democracy Fellow. She regularly writes for different media, including The Daily Telegraph.

Awards and honours
Mulqueeny was included in the 166th annual edition of Who's Who, and was voted onto the Wired 100 list, Tech City 100 and BIMA Hot 10. She was voted one of the top ten women in technology by The Guardian and was named in the top ten Tech Heroes for Good by NESTA.

She was appointed as an Officer of the Order of the British Empire (OBE) in the 2016 Birthday Honours for services to technology and education.

Personal life 
Mulqueeny lives in Surrey with her two daughters.

References

Living people
1971 births
Alumni of the University of Surrey
British women computer scientists
People from Sidcup
Officers of the Order of the British Empire